The Second Link Expressway  is a  controlled-access highway in Johor, Malaysia. It runs from Senai, Kulai District near the international airport to the Malaysia–Singapore Second Link at Tanjung Kupang, Johor Bahru District.

Route background

The Kilometre Zero for the entire expressway is located at the Malaysia–Singapore border at the Malaysia–Singapore Second Link.

History

Construction of the Second Link
In July 1989, United Engineers Malaysia Berhad (UEM) submitted a proposal to the government of Malaysia to privatize the construction of a second link to Singapore. The acceptance of the proposal brought about the signing of a concession agreement in July 1993, giving exclusive rights and authority to UEM to design, construct, manage, operate and maintain the bridge and expressways for a period of 30 years commencing 27 July 1993.

Following this, a novation agreement was executed in May 1994, whereby UEM assigned all its rights, liabilities and obligations in respect of the concession agreement to Linkedua (Malaysia) Berhad, a wholly owned subsidiary of UEM.

The major components of the project are the Second Crossing bridge, 44 kilometers of expressways, The Sultan Abu Bakar Customs, Immigration and Quarantine Complex, three toll plazas, two rest and service areas and other ancillary facilities. The bridge was designed to accommodate up to 200,000 vehicles a day.

Opening ceremony
The Second Link was opened to traffic on 2 January 1998. It was officially opened on 18 April the same year by the Prime Ministers of both countries, namely Dato' Seri Dr. Mahathir Mohamad of Malaysia and Goh Chok Tong of Singapore. The Malaysia–Singapore Second Crossing heralded a new era in bilateral relations, and brought with it the promise of improved economic and social ties.

At 2007, PLUS Expressway Berhad has entered into conditional agreements with the UEM Group to acquire the entire interests in Expressway Lingkaran Tengah Sdn Bhd (Elite) and Linkedua (Malaysia) Bhd for RM866mil. That mean ELITE and LINKEDUA became wholly owned subsidiaries of PLUS Expressways Berhad.

Pontian Link
A new link heading towards Pontian (Pontian Link) through the Pulai Interchange Exit 307A at km 15.3 on the Second Link Expressway was opened to traffic starting from 1:00 pm, 10 November 2007 on Saturday.

The Pontian Link provides easy access for highway users, connecting the Second Link Expressway (from Pulai Interchange) to Ulu Choh-Gelang Patah Interchange (KM5).

Construction of the 2.7 km link started on 17 April 2006 and was fully completed on 16 October 2007.

Tolls Rate

Toll payments are for the expressway and Second Link tolls. Only Touch 'n Go, PLUSMiles, SmartTAG and MyRFID electronic payment system are accepted at all Second Link toll plazas, and is the only accepted paying method at the Perling, Lima Kedai and Tanjung Kupang toll plazas, though top-up lanes are available. Singapore dollar is also accepted at all Second Link toll plazas but at the rate of 1:1 (i.e. Pay S$1.00 for RM1.00, and all change are given in Malaysian ringgit).

Perling Toll Plaza
(Touch 'n Go, MyRFID and Smart TAG only)

Lima Kedai Toll Plaza (TLK)
(Touch 'n Go and Smart TAG only)

Tanjung Kupang Toll Plaza (TTK)
(Touch 'n Go and Smart TAG only)

Straight line (to/from Singapore to/from Second Link Expressway)

(U-Turn) Expressway components

(U-Turn) Bridge components

List of interchanges, laybys, and rest and service areas

Senai Link

Northern and Southern Links (Main Link)

Pontian-Johor Bahru Parkway (Pontian Link)

See also
 Johor–Singapore Causeway
 Malaysia–Singapore Second Link
 Pasir Gudang Highway
 Malaysian expressway system

References

External links
 PLUS Expressway Berhad
 Malaysian Highway Authority

1997 establishments in Malaysia
Expressways and highways in Johor
Ring roads in Malaysia
North–South Expressway (Malaysia)